Bravo Peak is a  summit located in British Columbia, Canada.

Description

Bravo Peak is situated in the Waddington Range of the Coast Mountains, in a remote wilderness area that few visit. Other neighbors include Mount Munday, Grenelle Mountain and Spearman Peak, which is the nearest higher neighbor. Precipitation runoff from Bravo Peak drains to Tiedemann Creek → Homathko River → Bute Inlet. Topographic relief is significant as the summit rises over 900 meters (2,950 feet) above the Tiedemann Glacier in 0.6 kilometer (0.37 mile).

History
The peak's name was originally identified on mountaineer Don Munday's 1934 map, and appeared in subsequent climber's guides before being officially adopted May 1, 1978, by the Geographical Names Board of Canada.

An ascent of the summit made in July 1950 by Allen Steck, William W. Dunmire, Oscar Cook, Richard Houston, James Wilson, Philip Bettler, William Long and Raymond de Saussure was possibly the first ascent.

Climate

Based on the Köppen climate classification, Bravo Peak has an ice cap climate. Most weather fronts originate in the Pacific Ocean, and travel east toward the Coast Mountains where they are forced upward by the range (Orographic lift), causing them to drop their moisture in the form of rain or snowfall. As a result, the Coast Mountains experience high precipitation, especially during the winter months in the form of snowfall. Temperatures can drop below −20 °C with wind chill factors  below −30 °C. This climate supports the Bravo and Tiedemann glaciers which surround the slopes of Bravo Peak.

See also
 
 Geography of British Columbia

References

External links
 Weather: Bravo Peak

Pacific Ranges
Three-thousanders of British Columbia
Waddington Range
Range 2 Coast Land District
Coast Mountains